Alika Veniaminovna Smekhova (real name   Alla, March 27, 1968, Moscow, RSFSR, USSR) is a  Soviet and Russian actress, singer, TV presenter. Honored Artist of Russia (2008).

Biography
Alika Veniaminovna Smekhova was born on March 27, 1968 in Moscow in the family of actor Veniamin Smekhov and radio journalist Alla Smekhova.

Her sister Elena (born 1963), is now a writer.

She began acting in film in 1985.

In 1991 she graduated from the  Russian Academy of Theatrical Art  (GITIS), specializing in  Music Theater Actor.

The most popular songs in her performance    Do Not Interrupt  (a duet with Alexander Buinov) and  Another's Kiss.

She was married three times. Her first husband was scriptwriter of the film Assa Sergei Livnev. There are two sons Artyom (2000) and Makar (2007)

In 2022, she opposed the Russian invasion of Ukraine.

Selected filmography
 Courier as Nina (1986) 
 Rock'n'roll for Princesses as Princess Lymphatusa (1991)
 My Fair Nanny as cameo (2004)
 Love in the Big City as Raisa (2009)
 Office Romance. Our Time as woman on the session (2011)
 You and I as Lana's mother (2011)
  Two Fathers, Two Sons as Margo  (2013—2016)	
 Londongrad as Lidia (2015)
In Russian dubbing cartoon Cars and its sequels voiced by Sally Carrera (original voice actress: Bonnie Hunt).

Discography  
I'm Waiting for You Very Much (1996)
  Another's Kiss (1997)
   Wild Duck  (1999)
 For You  (2002)

References

External links

 Official site
 

1968 births
Living people
Actresses from Moscow
Singers from Moscow
Soviet film actresses
Russian film actresses
Russian television actresses
Soviet women singers
Russian television presenters
Honored Artists of the Russian Federation
Russian Academy of Theatre Arts alumni
Soviet child actresses
20th-century Russian women singers
20th-century Russian singers
Russian women television presenters
Russian activists against the 2022 Russian invasion of Ukraine